The 1930–31 United States collegiate men's ice hockey season was the 37th season of collegiate ice hockey in the United States.

Regular season

Standings

References

1930–31 NCAA Standings

External links
College Hockey Historical Archives

1930–31 United States collegiate men's ice hockey season
College